V Day or V-Day may refer to:
 Victory Day, public holidays in various countries commemorating victories in important battles or wars
 Victory Day, the day an operation successfully concludes, see military designation of days and hours
 V-Day (movement), a global movement to end violence against women and girls
 V-Day, a political campaign of public mobilisation in Italy organized by Beppe Grillo in 2007
 Valentine's Day
 'V-Day', a song from the album P.H.U.Q. by The Wildhearts
 V Day, an Irish COVID-19 documentary film

See also
 V-E Day or Victory in Europe Day, the public holiday celebrated in May 1945 to mark the end of World War II in Europe
 V-J Day or Victory over Japan Day, the day on which the surrender of Japan occurred, effectively ending World War II, and subsequent anniversaries of that event